Detelin Cheneshkov (born 7 August 1984) is a Bulgarian football player, who currently plays for Botev Kozloduy as a midfielder.

External links 
 

1984 births
Living people
Bulgarian footballers
First Professional Football League (Bulgaria) players
FC Botev Vratsa players
FC Chernomorets Burgas players
Association football midfielders